Kronichthys subteres is a species of armored catfish endemic to Brazil where it occurs in the Ribeira de Iguape River basin.  This species grows to a length of  TL.

K. subteres inhabits streams with rocky and sandy bottom. This species forages both during the day and at night, grazing on microscopic algae, mostly diatoms and green algae growing on rocks and submersed vegetation. They occasionally take chironomid and simuliid larvae, as well as tiny crustaceans. Before grazing on a patch with dense sediment, the fish makes wiggling head-down movements which raise sediment, which is blown away by the water current. When grazing algae off the substrate, the fish makes vigorous mouth movements, and moves by jerky movements probably related to its mouth making alternate grazing and attaching to the substrate. K. subteres leaves conspicuous grazing marks on exposed rocks. These fish may re-graze a given spot by moving backwards.

References 
 

Loricariidae
Catfish of South America
Endemic fauna of Brazil
Freshwater fish of Brazil
Environment of Paraná (state)
Environment of São Paulo (state)
Taxa named by Alípio de Miranda-Ribeiro
Fish described in 1908